Anthony Lamar "Tony" Romeo (March 7, 1938 – May 2, 1996) was an American football tight end in the American Football League for the Dallas Texans and Boston Patriots.  Mr. Romeo played high school football for Hillsborough High School, Tampa, Florida. He was inducted into his high school's football hall of fame in 2001. He played college football at Florida State University and was drafted in the 19th round of the 1961 NFL Draft by the Washington Redskins.  Mr. Romeo was a part of the growing evangelical movement among professional football players.  During the off season and after his retirement he traveled widely speaking in Southern Baptist and other evangelical churches.  Romeo was also known for beginning the first chapel services in professional football. Following his pro career, he spent time in the ministry before putting his FSU business degree to work.

He died on May 2, 1996 of melanoma. He was survived by his wife, two daughters, one son-in-law, two sisters, one brother, and three grandsons.

References

1938 births
1996 deaths
American football tight ends
Boston Patriots players
Dallas Texans (AFL) players
Florida State Seminoles football players
Players of American football from St. Petersburg, Florida
American Football League players
Deaths from melanoma